The Deputy Prime Minister of France, more properly known as the Vice President of the Council of Ministers, was a sinecure position that existed during the Third and Fourth Republics, as well as the Vichy regime during World War II. It was reserved for the leaders of junior parties during coalition governments.

During the Vichy regime, the title was in fact bestowed on the de facto prime minister.

Its first holder was Eugène Penancier, who served under Édouard Daladier in 1932, and its last was Guy Mollet, who served under Pierre Pflimlin in 1958.

List of deputy prime ministers of France (during World War II)

French Third Republic
French Fourth Republic
Vichy France